Cullenia is a genus of flowering plants native to India and Sri Lanka. Earlier classification schemes place the genus in the kapok-tree family (Bombacaceae), but the Angiosperm Phylogeny Group places it in the mallow family (Malvaceae).

The name is after General William Cullen (1785–1862), a Resident in the court of the Maharaja of Travancore who also took an interest in botany.

References

 
Malvaceae genera
Helicteroideae